Nigel Thomas (born 1 February 2001) is a Dutch professional footballer who plays as a left winger for Paços de Ferreira.

Club career
Thomas joined Paços de Ferreira on 8 July 2022, signing a three-year contract.

International career
Born in the Netherlands, Thomas is of Curaçaoan descent. He is a youth international for the Netherlands. He was called up to the preliminary squad for the Curaçao national team for the 2021 CONCACAF Gold Cup.

Career statistics

Club

Notes

Honours

Netherlands U17
 UEFA European Under-17 Championship: 2018

References

2001 births
Living people
Dutch footballers
Dutch expatriate footballers
Netherlands youth international footballers
Dutch people of Curaçao descent
Association football forwards
Sparta Rotterdam players
PSV Eindhoven players
Jong PSV players
F.C. Paços de Ferreira players
Eerste Divisie players
Footballers from Rotterdam
Expatriate footballers in Portugal
Curaçao expatriate sportspeople in Portugal